André Gauthier may refer to:
 André Gauthier (politician)
 André Gauthier (sculptor)